Governor Mitchell may refer to:

Alexander Graham Mitchell (born 1923), 1st Governor of the Turks and Caicos from 1973 to 1975
Charles Mitchell (colonial administrator) (1836–1899), 4th Governor of Fiji
David Brydie Mitchell (1760–1837), 27th Governor of Georgia
Henry L. Mitchell (1831–1903), 16th Governor of Florida
Nathaniel Mitchell (1753–1814), 16th Governor of Delaware
Philip Mitchell (colonial administrator) (1890–1964), 7th Governor of Uganda from 1935 to 1940, 16th Governor of Fiji from 1942 to 1944, and 18th Governor of Kenya from 1944 to 1952
Robert Byington Mitchell (1823–1882), 7th Governor of New Mexico Territory